Bruno Nicolás Piano Rosewarne (born 4 April 1977) is an Uruguayan football manager and former player who played as a central defender. He is the current assistant coach of Peñarol.

External links

1977 births
Living people
Uruguayan footballers
Uruguayan expatriate footballers
Uruguay international footballers
Deportivo Maldonado players
Danubio F.C. players
C.A. Cerro players
Rampla Juniors players
Santiago Morning footballers
Club Universitario de Deportes footballers
Comisión de Actividades Infantiles footballers
APEP FC players
Atromitos Yeroskipou players
El Tanque Sisley players
SC Young Fellows Juventus players
Chilean Primera División players
Cypriot First Division players
Expatriate footballers in Argentina
Expatriate footballers in Chile
Expatriate footballers in Peru
Expatriate footballers in Cyprus
Expatriate footballers in Switzerland
Association football defenders
Uruguayan football managers
Rocha F.C. managers